Magnolia urraoense is a species of plant in the family Magnoliaceae. It is endemic to Colombia.

References

urraoense
Endemic flora of Colombia
Taxonomy articles created by Polbot
Taxobox binomials not recognized by IUCN